The Sheer is a Dutch band playing pop and melodic rock music.

They had some success with the single Right Now and the debut album The Keyword Is Excitement! in their home country, both produced by Daniel Presley. Their third single entitled "The Girl That Lost Her Mind" came in at #40 in the Dutch Top 40. In 2004, the band won the prestigious Zilveren Harp (Silver Harp) for their contribution and promise to the Dutch Pop Culture.

Bandmembers
 Bart van Liemt (lead vocals, guitar)
 Jasper Geluk (keyboards, backing vocals)
 JanPeter Hoekstra (guitar, slide guitar, backing vocals)
 Jorn van der Putte (bass, backing vocals)
 Gert-Jan Zegel (drums)

History
 2000: Four friends from a music school started to rearrange old songs and write their own. "The Sheer" was born. Bart van Liemt, lead singer and foremost composer of the band, has been inspired by the British pop and rock music from the 1960s and the Britpop movement from the early 1990s. The result is a catchy combination of melodious pop/rock music with some British influence.

 2001: They released their first demo, titled "The Sheer" and started touring in September 2001 on the "Meet The Sheer Tour". The Demo was considered a success, receiving positive responses from FRET, Live XS and Music Maker. "The Sheer" is doing many concerts and make appearances on both the regional and national radio. Radio programs such as "BNN For Live" on Radio 2 and "Isabelle" on 3FM were only a few shows on which they were asked to play. Keyboardist Jasper Geluk is often playing with another Haarlem band, the Dollybird, with whom he played at Lowlands 2001. During "Popslag 2001", a 3FM talent show, "The Sheer" reached the finals and was preliminarily selected as the first-place winner. After a re-count, the conclusion was reached that the band "This Beautiful Mess" had a few more votes, so "The Sheer" ranked second. Their debut on national television was on TMF and "The Sheer" had been invited to "2 Meter Sessies" on Kink FM.

Discography

Albums
2004 - "The Keyword Is Excitement"
2006 - "Feel The Need"
2009 - "Here And Now And Long Before"

Singles
2003 - "Something To Say" #45 Mega Top 50 #tip Top 40
2004 - "It Only Gets Better" #20 Mega Top 50 #tip Top 40
2004 - "Right Now" #10 Mega Top 50 #38 Top 40
2005 - "Stay Awake"  #15 Mega Top 50
2006 - "The Girl That Lost Her Mind" #3 Mega Top 50, #25 Top 40
2006 - "Understand" #tip Top 40
2006 - "All I Forget"

Collaborations
2005 - "Hanginaround" (Counting Crows feat. The Sheer and Bløf). The song is featured on the #1 hit single "Holiday in Spain".

All chart performances are taken from the Dutch charts: Mega Top 50 and Top 40.

FIFA 07

"Understand", one of the singles from The Sheer, is the title song of the football video game FIFA 07. The band immediately said yes when the makers of the game asked them if they could use their song. It wasn't the first time that a Dutch band has made a title song of an Electronic Arts game. Blues Brother Castro, another Dutch band, already made a song in FIFA 06. The game has been released on the PlayStation 2, PSP, Xbox, Xbox 360 and Nintendo GameCube.

References

External links
 Official website The Sheer

Dutch musical groups